Karl Plutus (11 September 1904 – 12 November 2010) was an Estonian jurist and the oldest verified living man in Estonia 2006–2010.

Plutus was born in Kolu Manor, Virumaa. He spent his childhood in Eastern Estonia and Saint Petersburg, where his family had moved to in 1913, and witnessed the October Revolution. In 1921, his family returned to Estonia. During The Second World War he was in Soviet rear and was not sent to the front line. He studied law instead and became a jurist. He worked in this occupation until his retirement in 1992.

In his later years Plutus lived with his sister who was younger than him by eight years. His hobbies were fishing and dancing. He died on 12 November 2010 at age 106.

References

External links
 Pärnu Postimees: sajandivanune mees hoiab end vormis kalapüügiga
 Eesti Päevaleht: Karl Plutus seisis Aurora paugu ajal Neeva kaldal
 Postimees: Saja-aastane mees täitis ülikooli kohvikus unistuse
 Maaleht: Kümne aasta pärast 113
 Tartu Postimees Foto: Kuldkala õngitsemise võistlusel osales Eesti vanim mees
 Postimees: Eesti vanim mees sai 105-aastaseks

1904 births
2010 deaths
People from Kadrina Parish
People from the Governorate of Estonia
20th-century Estonian lawyers
Estonian centenarians
Men centenarians
21st-century Estonian people
Soviet lawyers